R. spectabilis may refer to:

Reithrodontomys spectabilis, the Cozumel harvest mouse, a rodent species
Rubus spectabilis, a flowering plant species

Synonyms
Redtenbacheria spectabilis, a synonym of Redtenbacheria insignis, a fly species